Redemption is a 1999 novel written by Jewish writer Howard Fast, who wrote the novel Spartacus in the 1950s. Redemption is both a romance, a legal drama, and Fast's first suspense novel, depicting Ike Goldman, an old professor emeritus falling in love with a woman named Elizabeth, who is later accused of her ex-husband's murder. The novel is published by Harcourt Brace & Company.

References

External links 
 
 

1999 American novels
American romance novels
American thriller novels
Legal thriller novels
Novels by Howard Fast
Contemporary romance novels